The following is a list of mayors of the city of Mariupol. It includes positions equivalent to mayor, such as chairperson of the city council executive committee.

Mayors

Russian Empire

Soviet Union

Ukraine

Donetsk People's Republic 
 Dmitriy Kuzmenko, 2014 (de facto)
 Konstantin Ivashchenko, 2022-2023 (de facto, DPR administration)
 Oleg Morgun, 23 January 2023- (de facto, DPR administration)

First Secretary

See also
 Mariupol history

References

Mayors
Mariupol
History of Mariupol